Ramaria acrisiccescens, commonly known as the blah coral, is a coral fungus in the family Gomphaceae. It is found in the forests of northwestern North America.

Taxonomy
The species was first described scientifically by mycologists Currie Marr and Daniel Stuntz in their 1974 monograph, "Ramaria of western Washington". It is classified in the subgenus Laeticolora. It is commonly known as the "blah coral".

Description
Fruit bodies consist of elongated branched with a roughly parallel arrangement. Each branch itself branches up to 9 times in a dichotomous fashion; each of these branches is slender, typically 1–12 mm in diameter. The branch tips are usually rounded. The context has a fleshy or fibrous consistency, but it becomes brittle and chalky when dry; it sometimes has pinkish or brownish tones in age, and does not react to iron sulfate or Melzer's reagent. The stipe of young fruit bodies is white, while the branches range from shades of grey, to beige, and even orange. The spores have colors of pale yellow and cream. The lower branches tend to bruise a brownish color. The color of the branch tips vary, ranging from more or less the same color as the branch, to pallid, or, especially in young specimens, infused with pinkish or purple tones in a small spotted transition.

The spore print is grayish-yellow. Spores are somewhat cylindrical to roughly elliptical, ornamented with lobed warts, and measure about 10.1 by 4.9 μm. The basidia (spore-bearing cells) are club-shaped, one- to four-spored (although most have four), and measure 40–90 by 7–13 μm. The species lacks basal clamps.

Habitat and distribution
Fruit bodies of Ramaria acrisiccescens grow on the ground under western hemlock, typically in mixed forests. It has been recorded from Washington and California.

Similar species
Ramaria velocimutans is similar, but has a brownish hyphae on the stipe and a brownish band within.

References

External links

Gomphaceae
Fungi described in 1974
Fungi of North America